Tara Abboud (born 2001) is a Jordanian-Palestinian film and television actress.

Career
Born in Amman, Abboud was a child actress, starting at ten years-old with short films, such as Motaz Matar’s film From Behind The Door and Tima Shomali’s Log In. She had a leading role in Amjad Al-Rasheed’s 2009 film Princess Of The Mountains. 

She had a lead role in the Jordanian television series Oboor in 2019, appearing alongside Saba Mubarak. Abboud was named one of Screen International’s Arab Stars of Tomorrow in 2020. 

She appeared as the eponymous Amira in the 2021 Mohamed Diab film Amira. The film won the Lanterna Magica Award and the Interfilm Award at the 78th Venice International Film Festival. It was selected as Jordan’s entry for the Academy Awards but was withdrawn by the Jordanian Royal Film Commission after backlash to the films controversial storyline, in which Abboud’s Palestinian character Amira discovers she was conceived by smuggled sperm from an Israeli prisoner guard rather than her imprisoned Palestinian father. She played Noor in the 2022 film Rebel which had its world premiere during the 75th edition of the Cannes Film Festival.

In 2023 Abboud will appear in the Disney+ Star original series Culprits with an ensemble cast including Gemma Arterton, Eddie Izzard, Kirby Howell-Baptiste, Kevin Vidal, and Niamh Algar.

Selected filmography

References

External links

2001 births
Living people
Jordanian actresses
Jordanian film actresses
Jordanian television actresses
Jordanian people of Palestinian descent
Date of birth unknown